The Second City Training Center was founded in the mid-1980s to facilitate the growing demand for workshops and instruction from the world famous The Second City theatre.  Training Centers are located in Chicago, Toronto and Los Angeles.  Satellite centers formerly existed in Metro Detroit, Las Vegas, Cleveland and New York City.

History
The centers offer a variety of classes for different ages.  Programs of study include improvisation, comedy writing, acting & scene study, stand-up, clowning, music improvisation, and teen & youth courses.  The flagship program is the Conservatory which trains performers in the Second City style of creating sketch comedy through a process of improvisational techniques.  The Conservatory requires an audition to enter the program and culminates with a show written and performed for several weeks by the graduating class. Chicago Conservatory Graduates are eligible to audition and perform with the Training Center House Teams.

Each center also offers specialized workshops in areas such as advanced improvisation techniques, long-form improvisation, and stand-up comedy.  For students who do not live near one of the Training Centers, they offer three-day intensives and one-week immersions held at the centers throughout the year as well as online comedy and writing classes.  The Training Centers also offers a variety of classes for children and teens including winter, spring and summer break camps.

Former Training Center students include Steve Carell, Tina Fey, Scott Adsit, Anders Holm, Amy Poehler, Cecily Strong, Mike Myers, Chris Farley, Tim Meadows, Bonnie Hunt, Stephen Colbert, Halle Berry, Sean Hayes, Jon Favreau, Hinton Battle, Jack McBrayer, Dave Foley, Kevin McDonald and Josh Willis. Classes are taught by working professionals, many of whom are current and former Second City performers.

From 1985 until his death in 2001, the Second City Training Center was headed by Martin de Maat. The Chicago Training Center facility is now dedicated to him and features a plaque bearing one of his most famous quotes, "You are pure potential."

The Second City Training Centers operate under the leadership of Kevin Frank (Artistic Director, Toronto), Joshua Funk (Artistic Director, Hollywood), Nancy Hayden (Artistic Director, Chicago) and Kerry Sheehan (President, Second City Training Centers).

References

External links
Official website
CDMIT

Training Center
Education in Chicago
Education in Toronto
Education in Los Angeles